The Grand Rapids Rockets are a defunct International Hockey League team. They were members of the IHL from the 1950–1951 season to 1955–1956 season. They were based in Grand Rapids, Michigan and played their home games in Stadium Arena. The team had previously been a member of the Eastern Amateur Hockey League for the 1949–1950 season, before moving to the IHL. Their team colors were blue and gold.

After the 1955–1956 season, the team moved to Huntington, West Virginia and became the Huntington Hornets. They played one season in the IHL before folding.

Standings

Defunct ice hockey teams in the United States
International Hockey League (1945–2001) teams
Sports in Grand Rapids, Michigan
Ice hockey clubs established in 1949
Sports clubs disestablished in 1956
Professional ice hockey teams in Michigan
Eastern Hockey League teams
1949 establishments in Michigan
1956 disestablishments in Michigan